Hopkinson is a surname of English and Welsh origin. Notable people with the surname include:

 Abdur Rahman Slade Hopkinson (born 1934), West Indian writer
 Alfred Hopkinson (18511939), British politician
 Alister Hopkinson (194199), New Zealand rugby union player
 Amanda Hopkinson (born 1948), British scholar and literary translator
 Austin Hopkinson (18791962), British politician
 Barney Hopkinson (born before 1965), British Anglican priest
 Bertram Hopkinson (18741918), British engineer
 Split-Hopkinson pressure bar, an apparatus for testing the dynamic stress-strain response of materials, named after Bertram Hopkinson
 Bobby Hopkinson (born 1990), English footballer
 Carl Hopkinson (born 1981), English cricketer
 Charles Hopkinson (18691962), American artist
 Deborah Hopkinson (born before 2004), American writer of children's books
 Eddie Hopkinson (19352004), English football goalkeeper
 Edward Hopkinson (18591922), British politician and engineer
 Emilius Hopkinson (18691951), British medical doctor, ornithologist and writer
 Francis Hopkinson (173791), American writer and signer of the Declaration of Independence
 Francis Hopkinson House, a historic home in Bordentown, Burlington County, New Jersey, onetime residence of Francis Hopkinson
 Fred Hopkinson (1908after 1935), English footballer
 Frederick Hopkinson (19222004), British sports shooter who competed in the 1956 Summer Olympics
 George F. Hopkinson (18951943), British general
 Gerald Hopkinson (before 1930after 1952), British general 
 Gordon Hopkinson (born 1933), English footballer 
 Greta Hopkinson (190193), British wood sculptor
 Harry Hopkinson (190279), English yodeler
 Henry Hopkinson, 1st Baron Colyton (190296), British diplomat and politician
 Hopkinson (MCC cricketer), English cricketer
 Ian Hopkinson (born 1950), English footballer
 John Hopkinson (184998), British physicist
 Hopkinson and Imperial Chemical Industries Professor of Applied Thermodynamics, University of Cambridge, named after John Hopkinson
 Hopkinson's law, the magnetic analogy to Ohm's law, named after John Hopkinson
 John Hopkinson (priest) (before 19041957), British Anglican priest
 John H. Hopkinson III (1934-2019) Physician, Pennsylvania 
 Joseph Hopkinson (17701842), U.S. Representative from Pennsylvania, later a federal judge
 Mark Hopkinson (194992), American proxy murderer
 Mick Hopkinson (born 1942), English footballer
 Nalo Hopkinson (born 1960), Jamaican writer
 Peter Hopkinson (19202007), British film-maker and director
 Rusty Hopkinson (active from 1990s), Australian drummer
 Samuel Hopkinson (cricketer) (182587), Australian cricketer
 Samuel Hopkinson (190358), English footballer
 Simon Hopkinson (born 1954), British chef and cookery writer
 Thomas Hopkinson (170951), American lawyer and public official
 Tom Hopkinson (190590), British journalist, picture magazine editor, author, and teacher
 W. C. Hopkinson (18801914), British intelligence agent
 William John Hopkinson (18871970), Canadian artist 

 Given name
 Francis Hopkinson Smith (18381915), American author, artist and engineer
 Hopkinson Smith (born 1946), American lutenist
 William Hopkinson Cox (18561950), American politician in Kentucky

See also
 Ambrose Hopkinson House, a historic house located in Olney, Illinois
 Francis Hopkinson School, a historic school building located in the Juniata neighborhood of Philadelphia, Pennsylvania
 George Hopkinson House, a historic house located in Groveland, Massachusetts
 Grace Hopkinson Eliot Hall, a historic dormitory building on the Radcliffe Quadrangle of Harvard University
 Hopkinson Gold Medal, awarded for piano performance by the Royal College of Music
 Hopkinson v Police, a New Zealand court case relating to burning of the national flag
 Hopkinsons, an Australian bus company in Western Sydney
 Hopkin
 Hopkins (disambiguation)
 

English-language surnames
Patronymic surnames
Surnames from given names